Drezus (drē-zəˈs; born Jeremiah Manitopyes; August 28, 1982) is Plains Cree rapper and activist based in Calgary, Alberta. Drezus' accomplishments in the field of music include awards for Best Music Video, Best Producer/Engineer, Best Rap/Hip Hop Album, and Indigenous Entertainer of the Year. These awards followed the success of his album, Indian Warpath, released in the summer of 2014. However, Manitopyes' life was not always filled with awards and recognition. Growing up as a First Nations person, he faced multiple jail stints and violence in his life. Manitopyes has found meaning in his music and is working to share it with those who will listen.

Early life 
Jeremiah Manitopyes was born in Saskatoon, Saskatchewan on August 28, 1982.

Music career

Early career 
War Party, a successful Native hip-hop group from the 90s, found themselves very impressed with the young rappers work after he laid down a 20-minute freestyle for them. One member of the group, Big Stomp, was especially impressed with the young rapper, pointing out the fact that Manitopyes was "a diamond in the rough." He was able to keep with the beat flawlessly and had no trouble flowing with the production.

2000–2012 
Drezus was invited to start Rezofficial, which would include some of the former members of War Party. Their debut album, The Foundation, would go on to win the Canadian Aboriginal Music Award for Best Rap/Hip-Hop album in 2004. Their big break would come in the form of an invitation to perform at the 2010 Vancouver Winter Olympic Games. However, Drezus was unable to make it. As a result of his second distribution charge, he spent three years in jail.

2012–present 
While attending a drug rehabilitation center in 2012, he took a cultural course which opened his eyes to the truth of his ancestry. As a result of such, he learned the songs of the Natives, and began to care about who he was as a person more than who he was on the streets. Although Manitopyes refers to this moment as one of the most eye-opening moments of his life, the real, single defining moment of his life would come soon after. After being released, he robbed a couple individuals in Winnipeg, but he didn't get away without repercussions. Their crew caught up to Manitopyes, robbed him of everything he had, and stomped him out. It was then that he decided he was done with this life forever.

"I had two choices: The choice to retaliate, which meant at least someone losing their life…or getting the fuck out of there," he says. "It was a real ‘man-up’ moment." As a result of this event, he moved back to Calgary where he found his family waiting for him, including a young son he had left behind. His life would forever change, as he started feeling a connection to the people he had once left behind. He had new perspective that would undoubtedly change his music, as demonstrated with the 2013 release of Red Winter. As a result of such album, Drezus has won multiple awards and been invited to visit and speak to government agencies such as the Calgary Youth Offender Center.

Since the release of Red Winter, Drezus has recognized the fact that songs like Warpath are not going to be played on the radio, but he says that now, he is exactly where he should be. As of 2017, he has begun work with Taboo from the Black Eyed Peas and has caught the eye of MTV/VMA with a nomination with Taboo for a possible award. Drezus, alongside Taboo with Mag7, officially won 'Best Fight Against The System" MTV VMA Award in Summer 2017. He is expected to drop a new album this summer, but the future of Drezus is yet to be seen.

In August 2019 he appeared in Yellowstone (American TV series) (Season 2, Episode 8).

Artistry

Musical style 
Manitopyes has compared himself to artists such as Public Enemy and N.W.A with his biggest influence of all time being Ice Cube. Some of his other influences, however, include Notorious BIG, Red Hot Chili Peppers, Wu-Tang Clan, Dr. Dre, and Run-DMC. His early musical style was similar to War Party, a Native hip-hop group. He would write about the gang lifestyle, but as he grew older, after a couple jail stints, he reformed his music to act as a retelling of his story, with ties to his Native life and history.

Activism 
Since his recent success, Drezus has worked on giving back to his community. He holds youth/community workshops and gives keynote speeches regarding his journey. He hopes that other can learn from him and be inspired to make more of themselves and push themselves to new limits. He is currently touring, hoping to spread his influence and spread word of his journey to as many people as possible. "I would tell them that they are all young warriors and have a special place in this world as light givers. Put the phone down and go shoot some hoops, feel the sun, snow, rain or whatever and just be thankful to be alive. There is always a way out of whatever seems to be bothering you or preventing you from being happy. Be yourself, love hard and work harder. Be proud to be. One day while you’re out chasing your dreams that light will find you and it will show you a whole different world full of opportunities and goodness. Go get it."

Discography 

Indian Summer
 Solomon's Prayer
 The Sequel
 Like This
 Cruisin' (ft. Lightningcloud)
 Say (ft. Inez)
 All I Can Be (ft. K-Riz)
 Free
 Free Part II (ft. Fendercase)
 Nehiyah Girl (ft. Joey Stylez)
 Warpath
 High Note (ft. Merkules, Nato & Sese)
 Reminisce (ft. Hellnback & Big Slim)
 What You Need (ft. Fayliesha)
 The Morning After
 Out My Window (ft. Young Kidd)
 Red Winter
 Intro
 Day of Action (ft. Main Flow)
 Red Winter
 Big Dreams (ft. Nato)
 Feel's Good (ft. Brooklyn)
 Me & U (ft. Inez Jasper)
 Lose Control
 Don't Give Up On Me
 Rose

Awards and nominations 

 Indigenous Music Awards:
 Best Music Video: Warpath
 Best Producer/Engineer: Indian Summer
 Best Rap/Hip-Hop Album: Indian Summer
 Indigenous Entertainer of the Year
 Canadian Aboriginal Music Awards:
 Best Rap/Hip-Hop Album: The Foundation
 MTV Video Music Award:
 Best Fight Against the System with Mag7
 The SOCAN Awards:
 Vince Fontaine Indigenous Song Award

References

External links 

Canadian male rappers
1982 births
Living people
First Nations musicians
Cree people
Musicians from Saskatoon
21st-century Canadian rappers
21st-century Canadian male musicians